Givin' It Up is a collaborative album by American musicians George Benson and Al Jarreau, released on October 24, 2006, by Concord Records. It contains songs previously recorded by both artists (Benson's "Breezin" and Jarreau's "Mornin") and original music. Other vocalists and musicians featured are Jill Scott, Patti Austin, Herbie Hancock, Stanley Clarke, Abe Laboriel, Chris Botti, Marcus Miller, and Paul McCartney. This project also includes standards by Billie Holiday ("God Bless the Child") and Sam Cooke ("Bring It On Home to Me"), pop songs by Seals and Crofts ("Summer Breeze") and Daryl Hall ("Everytime You Go Away") along with the jazz-swing "Four" by Miles Davis, and "Ordinary People" by John Legend.

In 2007, Benson was awarded his ninth (or tenth) and Jarreau was awarded his sixth Grammy Award for Best Traditional R&B Vocal Performance on "God Bless the Child" with Scott. Benson also won his tenth (or ninth) Grammy for Best Pop Instrumental Performance on "Mornin'", while "Breezin'" received a nomination for Best R&B Performance by a Duo or Group with Vocal.

Track listing

Personnel 
 George Benson – guitar, lead vocals (1, 3–6, 9–13), arrangements (4), backing vocals (7)
 Al Jarreau – lead vocals (1, 2, 3, 5, 8–13), vocal percussion (1, 2, 4, 10), backing vocals (2, 7), arrangements (8)
 Larry Williams – keyboards (1, 5), arrangements (1, 5, 10), acoustic piano (5, 10)
 Michael Broening – keyboards (2, 7, 13), programming (2, 7), arrangements (2, 7), organ (13)
 Herbie Hancock – acoustic piano (3)
 Patrice Rushen – keyboards (3, 10, 12), Fender Rhodes (4, 6, 8, 13), arrangements (4), acoustic piano (11)
 Rex Rideout – acoustic piano (6), arrangements (6)
 Barry Eastmond – keyboards (8), arrangements (8)
 Freddie Ravel – Fender Rhodes (9), clavinet (9), organ (9), synthesizers (9), Moog bass (9), drums (9), percussion programming (9), arrangements (9), BGV arrangements (9)
 Joe Turano – Wurlitzer electric piano (12), Hammond B3 organ (12), arrangements (12)
 Randy Waldman – acoustic piano (13), arrangements (13)
 Ray Fuller – guitar (1, 5)
 Dean Parks – guitar (1, 5, 10, 13), rhythm guitar (8)
 Freddie Fox – guitar (2, 7)
 Michael O'Neill – rhythm guitar (9)
 Michael Thompson – guitar (10)
 Abraham Laboriel – electric bass (1, 6, 13)
 Mel Brown – bass guitar (2, 7)
 Marcus Miller – bass guitar (3, 4, 5, 8, 10), arrangements (3)
 Stanley Clarke – bass guitar (11, 12)
 Vinnie Colaiuta – drums (1, 4, 5, 8, 10–13)
 Michael White – drums (2, 3, 7)
 Gregg Field – drums (6)
 Ricky Lawson – drums (6)
 Paulinho da Costa – percussion (1, 5, 8, 10, 13)
 Bashiri Johnson – percussion (8)
 Marion Meadows – saxophone (2, 7)
 Chris Botti – trumpet (8)
 John Burk – arrangements (4)
 Jill Scott – lead vocals (4)
 Patti Austin – lead and backing vocals (8), BGV arrangements (8)
 Maxi Anderson – backing vocals (8)
 Valerie Pinkston – backing vocals (8)
 Sharon Perry – backing vocals (8)
 Darlene Perry – backing vocals (8)
 Lorraine Perry – backing vocals (8)
 Sandra Simmons Williams – backing vocals (8)
 De'Ante Duckett – backing vocals (9, 13)
 Alethea Mills - backing vocals (9, 13)
 Chavonne Morris – backing vocals (9, 13)
 Fred Martin – BGV arrangements (9, 13)
 Paul McCartney – lead vocals (13)

Production 
 Producers – John Burk (All tracks); Michael Broening (Tracks 2 & 7); Patti Austin (Track 8); Freddie Ravel (Track 9).
 Co-Producers – Marcus Miller (Track 3); Larry Williams (Track 10); Chris Dunn (Track 11).
 Additional Production on Track 8 – Barry Eastmond and Gregg Field
 Executive Producers – Glen Barros, Kevin Lee and Noel Lee.
 Recording Engineers – Michael Broening, Myron Chandler, Jeff Harris, Don Murray, Charlie Paakkari, Seth Presant and Bill Smith.
 Additional Engineering – Kevin Becka, Barry Eastmond, Eric Ferguson, Carlos Martinez, Dennis Moody and John Wroble.
 Assistant Engineers – Phillip Broussard, Keith Gretlein, Casey Lewis and Paul Smith.
 Recorded at Henson Recording Studios, NRG Studios and Capitol Studios (Hollywood, CA); G Studio Digital (Studio City, CA); LAFX Studios, The Pass, Willyworld and Ravelation Studios (Los Angeles, CA); White Lightning Studios (Sylmar, CA); Porcupine Studios (Chandler, AZ); The "B" Hive (Phoenix, AZ); East Bay Studios (Tarrytown, NY).
 Pro Tools and Editing – Seth Presant, Bill Smith and German Villacorta.
 Additional Pro Tools Engineer – Alex Pavlides
 Mixed by Al Schmitt at Capitol Studios, assisted by Steve Genewick.
 Mastered by Doug Sax and Sangwook Nam at The Mastering Lab (Ojai, CA).
 A&R – Chris Dunn
 A&R Administration – Mary Hogan
 Production Consultant – Gerald McCauley
 Art Direction – Abbey Anna and Andrew Pham
 Design – Andrew Pham
 Photography – Randee St. Nicholas

Charts

Awards
2006 - 49th Annual GRAMMY Awards

References 

2006 albums
George Benson albums
Al Jarreau albums
Albums produced by Marcus Miller
Concord Records albums